Chimonanthus nitens is a species of the genus of wintersweets Chimonanthus and member of the family Calycanthaceae (syn. Meratia nitens (Oliver) Rehder & Wilson; C. campanulatus R.H.Chang & C.S.Ding; C. grammatus M.C.Liu; C. zhejangensis M.C.Liu).

Description
An evergreen shrub that grows up to 6 m tall, with leaves 2–18 cm long and 1.5–8 cm broad, and white to yellow flowers that appear in winter and are only slightly scented if at all.

Distribution
Native
Palearctic
China: Anhui, Fujian, Guangxi, Guizhou, Hubei, Hunan, Jiangsu, Jiangxi, Yunnan, Zhejiang. 
Source:

References

Laurales
Taxa named by Daniel Oliver
Calycanthaceae